Včelná is a municipality and village in České Budějovice District in the South Bohemian Region of the Czech Republic. It has about 2,300 inhabitants.

Notable people
Zdeněk Tikal (1929–1991), Australian ice hockey player
František Tikal (1933–2008), ice hockey player

References

Villages in České Budějovice District